Uridine-5′-triphosphate (UTP) is a pyrimidine nucleoside triphosphate, consisting of the organic base uracil linked to the 1′ carbon of the ribose sugar, and esterified with tri-phosphoric acid at the 5′ position. Its main role is as substrate for the synthesis of RNA during transcription. UTP is the precursor for the production of CTP via CTP synthetase. UTP can be biosynthesized from UDP by Nucleoside Diphosphate Kinase after using the phosphate group from ATP. UDP + ATP ⇌ UTP + ADP; both UTP and ATP are energetically equal.

The homologue in DNA is thymidine triphosphate (TTP or dTTP). UTP also has a deoxyribose form (dUTP).

Role in metabolism
UTP also has the role of a source of energy or an activator of substrates in metabolic reactions, like that of ATP, but more specific. When UTP activates a substrate (like Glucose-1-phosphate), UDP-glucose is formed and inorganic phosphate is released.  
UDP-glucose enters the synthesis of glycogen. UTP is used in the metabolism of galactose, where the activated form UDP-galactose is converted to UDP-glucose. UDP-glucuronate is used to conjugate bilirubin to a more water-soluble bilirubin diglucuronide. UTP is also used to activate amino sugars like Glucosamine-1-phosphate to UDP-glucosamine, and N-acetyl-glucosamine-1-phosphate to UDP-N-acetylglucosamine.

Role in receptor mediation
UTP also has roles in mediating responses by extracellular binding to the P2Y receptors of cells. UTP and its derivatives are still being investigated for their applications in human medicine.

See also
 CTP synthase

References

Nucleotides
Gene expression
Metabolism
Phosphate esters
Pyrimidinediones